The Boston Club is a segregated private gentlemen's club in New Orleans, Louisiana, US, founded in 1841 as a place for its white members to congregate and partake in the fashionable card game of Boston. It is the oldest remaining social club in the city, after the Elkin, Pelican, and Orleans Clubs closed prior to or due to the Civil War. The clubhouse has been located at 824 Canal Street since 1884, formerly 148 Canal St, on the edge of the Central Business District. It was built in 1844 by James Gallier as a city residence for Dr. William Newton Mercer, a planter in Mississippi and surgeon from the War of 1812. The Club itself was organized in 1841, by thirty leading mercantile and professional men, they were the heads of families and men of substance on the shady side of life, yet full of bonhomie and fond of the card game of Boston, from which this club was christened. It epitomized the South's most refined male tastes and attitudes, a member once noted, "Propriety of demeanor and proper courtesy are alone exacted within its portals."

History

Founded in 1841, the Boston Club is the third oldest Gentlemen's City Club in the United States behind the Philadelphia Club in Philadelphia and the Union Club of the City of New York in New York City. Members organized and rented rooms first at the Merchants Exchange, 126 Royal St, in the Vieux Carre, then 129/130 Canal Street until the Civil War when it closed from 1862 to 1866. After the war, it occupied 214 Royal Street (currently the Hotel Monteleone) until 1867 at which point it moved to 4 Carondelet Street, the former home of New Orleans financier, Edward J. Forstall. In 1884 it moved into its current clubhouse at 824 Canal Street (then known as 148 Canal Street) and the house was fully purchased by 1905. The club was closed for 3 years during the Civil War.

The Elkin Club, founded 1832 and shuttered in 1838, was the first social club in New Orleans. An open club, it sponsored dances and balls in the vicinity of Bayou St John and closed due to the financial crisis of 1837. The Pelican Club founded in 1843 and folded at the beginning of the Civil War, confined its membership through blackball policies to bankers, cotton brokers, attorneys, physicians, and political leaders; the smallest lapse in credit spelled denial of membership. Younger gentlemen, who had been rejected membership to the Pelican Club, organized The Orleans Club in 1851 with less restrictive membership policies, but similarly closed at the outset of the Civil War. A few members of this club would later found The Pickwick Club, the city's second-oldest gentleman's club, who would influence the development of modern-day Mardi Gras.

Unlike The Pickwick Club or Louisiana Club, the Boston Club was not initially a "closed club" and was more diverse. Members could invite guests into the club freely where they could use the premises "gratis," though in the traditional club style new members were put up through a blackball process. A few Jewish men, such as Judah P. Benjamin and the first Rex, Lewis Solomon, had been members of the club in its earlier days.  Eventually, however, the club became almost exclusively Anglo-American as racial attitudes in New Orleans hardened after the Civil War, and even white minorities would be blackballed leading to an air of anti-semitism,  especially with the rise of the Crescent City White League. For his merits early in his career, Edgar B. Stern was invited to join. Stern declined the invitation on learning that close Jewish friends would be unable to join. The Boston Club has no reciprocal relationships with other national or international gentlemen's clubs, unlike other revered national societal institutions such as the Union Club in New York, or the Metropolitan Club in Washington, D.C.

Famous guests
In 1873, Archibald Primrose, 5th Earl of Rosebery attended a luncheon.

General Ulysses S. Grant lunched at The Boston Club in 1880.

Oscar Wilde visited the club in Summer of 1882 while on tour and was made an honorary member. He gave a lecture at the Grand Opera House on Canal Street on “Decorative Art.”

John J. Pershing visited on February 17, 1920.

The Duke of Windsor and the Duchess of Windsor, February 21, 1950

It was customary, until 1992, for Rex (King of Carnival) and his queen to lunch at the club after the Rex parade during Mardi Gras. In addition, the Boston Club entertained the queen of the carnival and her court during the parade.

Notable members

Judah P. Benjamin, QC, lawyer and politician who was a US Senator from Louisiana, a Confederate Cabinet Officer and, after his escape to the United Kingdom at the end of the American Civil War, an English barrister. He was a member of the Union Club of New York.
Edward A. Bradford lawyer and unsuccessful nominee to the United States Supreme Court. Law partner of Judah P. Benjamin.

Eaton J. Bowers was a U.S. Representative from Mississippi.
Stephen Duncan a major planter and banker in Mississippi in the antebellum years, migrating there from his home state of Pennsylvania after getting a medical degree. He became the wealthiest cotton planter in the South prior to the American Civil War, and also invested in railroads and Midwest lands. He was also a member of the Union Club of New York.
Charles E. Fenner, President 1892–1904, Associate Justice Louisiana Supreme Court 1880–1893.
John Hamilton Fulton was president of National Park Bank from 1922 to 1927.
John Randolph Grymes Jr., FFV, Founding Member, an attorney in New Orleans, member of the Louisiana state legislature, U. S. attorney for Louisiana district, and aide-de-camp to General Andrew Jackson during the Battle of New Orleans.
Ernest L. Jahncke was United States Assistant Secretary of the Navy from 1929 to 1933.
Bradish Johnson was an American industrialist. He owned plantations and sugar refineries in Louisiana and a large distillery in New York City. Her inherited Woodland Plantation from one of his brothers before the Civil War. He eventually purchased a number of other plantations in the area: Pointe Celeste, Bellevue, and the Orange Farm. He also acquired two plantations above New Orleans which he renamed after his married daughters: Whitney Plantation and Carroll Plantation.
Hugh Kennedy (New Orleans) brother of Club President S. H. Kennedy.
Duncan F. Kenner was an American politician who served as a Deputy from Louisiana to the Provisional Congress of the Confederate States from 1861 to 1862. In 1864, he served as the chief diplomat from the Confederate States of America to Europe. Brother-in-law of Dick Taylor.

Arthur Pendleton Mason, FFV, President 1880-1883, of the Gunston Hall Mason's, was a lieutenant colonel in the Confederate States Army serving during the American Civil War. and later a merchant in New Orleans.
Paul C. P. McIlhenny was an American businessman and executive at family-owned McIlhenny Company, maker of Tabasco sauce and other Tabasco brand products at Avery Island, Louisiana.
John Albert Morris was an American businessman widely known as the "Lottery King" and a prominent figure in the sport of thoroughbred horse racing.
John M. Parker was an American Democratic politician from Louisiana, who served as the state's 37th Governor from 1920 to 1924. He was a friend and admirer of U.S. President Theodore Roosevelt.
LeRoy Percy was an attorney, planter, and politician in Mississippi. In 1910 he was elected to the United States Senate, serving until 1913.
Walker Percy Obl.S.B. (May 28, 1916 – May 10, 1990) was an American writer, whose interests included philosophy and semiotics. Percy is known for his philosophical novels set in and around New Orleans, the first of which, The Moviegoer, won the U.S. National Book Award for Fiction. Trained as a physician at Columbia University, Percy decided to instead become a writer following a bout of tuberculosis. He devoted his literary life to the exploration of "the dislocation of man in the modern age." His work displays a combination of existential questioning, Southern sensibility, and deep Catholic faith. He had a lifelong friendship with author and historian Shelby Foote. Percy spent much of his life in Covington, Louisiana, where he died of prostate cancer in 1990.
Thomas Jenkins Semmes, President 1883–1892, was an American politician who served as a Confederate States Senator from Louisiana from 1862 to 1865. He was the 1st cousin of Capt Raphael Semmes, of the C.S.S. Alabama.
John Slidell was an American politician, lawyer, and businessman. A native of New York, Slidell moved to Louisiana as a young man and became a staunch defender of slavery as a Representative and Senator.
Pierre Soule Founding Member, a Franco-American attorney, politician, and diplomat during the mid-19th century. President of the New Orleans Improvement Co., Serving as a United States senator from Louisiana from 1849 to 1853, he resigned to accept appointment as U.S. Minister to Spain, a post he held until 1855.
Gen. Dick Taylor, FFV, Club President 1868–1873, an American planter, politician, military historian, and Confederate general.
John Barnett Waterman was an American businessman, founder and executive at Waterman Steamship Corporation.
Maunsel White was an Episcopalian American politician, merchant, and entrepreneur. He is remembered for promoting the use of peppers and peppery sauces – a brand of which his descendants still manufacture today.  Although he is usually associated with New Orleans, he also resided in Plaquemines Parish, Louisiana, where he owned Deer Range Plantation, in addition to three other plantations, with 191 slaves in 1850.

Horse racing

Members of the Boston Club frequently patronized Jockey Clubs of the area, both the defunct Metairie Course (now the Metairie Cemetery) and the Fair Grounds Race Course, putting up high stakes purses to help offset the Jockey Club's expenses. "The Boston Club...being composed of gentlemen who know ‘what's what’...insured a numerous and distinguished attendance upon these occasions." Later noting "In the betting circles last evening... The wagering was spirited and lively, and a good deal of money will change hands as a result." Club Founding Member John Randolph Grymes owned filly Susan Yandal who raced in the first races at the Fair Grounds Race Course in 1838, his cousin Henry A. Tayloe, younger son of turfman John Tayloe III of  The Octagon, was one of the proprietors along with local, Bernard de Marigny.

Homes of The Boston Club
 1841–1855: Merchants Exchange, 126 Royal Street
 1855–1862: 129/130 Canal Street
 1862–1865: Club closed
 1865–1867: 214 Royal Street (Hotel Monteleone)
 1867–1884: 4 Carondelet Street (Forstall Mansion)
 1884: 824 Canal Street (then called 148 Canal Street)

Description

Entering from Canal Street, the entrance to the club is a 10x12 vestibule framed by sidelights between engaged ionic pilasters and columns, with a wooden door inscribed in a frosted glass the club's initials BC, opening into a marble-paved hallway. Adjacent, to the left through a solid mahogany door, is a well-decorated parlor, extending fifty-five feet deep from the front facade. Here can be found leather chairs, lace curtains, and rockers with foremost men of New Orleans discussing current events. There is a reception area with a large round table behind leading into formal and informal dining areas. The formal dining room is forty-five feet deep, with molded stucco ceiling cornices and large center ceiling medallion of floral designs, and mantels finished in the period Eastlake Style replacing earlier marble mantel carved with cherubs and flute players. The bar, located behind the informal dining area, is made of oak along with the wainscot running around the room. The second floor has two rooms, the front, a former card room while the rear is mainly used as a sitting room but can be converted easily into a dining room, it is finished in oak with cypress doors and is attached to a billiards room, board room and lady's water closet.

Significance
The Boston Club is a social club composed solely of Anglo-Americans since the turn of the century, with few details known about its constituents. Members usually announce their associations upon death, in their obituaries. Its clubhouse has held lavish balls, regular daily lunches, monthly dinners, and annual spring and fall parties. Its events and social activities were the fodder for many newspaper and social columns at the turn of the 19th century and on into the 20th century. That a lavish club lifestyle could be centered around something as simple as a card game serves as a sign of prosperous times in New Orleans.

In popular culture
In The Moviegoer, by Walker Percy, "Uncle Jules" is said to have suffered a heart attack (his second) and died at the Boston Club on Mardi Gras.

See also
The Pickwick Club
Union Club
Philadelphia Club
List of gentlemen's clubs in the United States
Mistick Krewe

References

Gentlemen's clubs in the United States
Clubs and societies in the United States
1841 establishments in Louisiana
Clubhouses on the National Register of Historic Places in Louisiana
Historic district contributing properties in Louisiana
New Orleans